Uška was a medieval župa (small administrative division) of Serbia in modern-day southeastern Serbia. It encompassed the territories around the Nišava and Vlasina rivers east of Glbočica (modern-day Leskovac).

Historical regions in Serbia
Subdivisions of Serbia in the Middle Ages